Eugenia sripadaense is a species of plant in the family Myrtaceae. It is endemic to Sri Lanka.

References

Flora of Sri Lanka
sripadaense
Endangered plants
Taxonomy articles created by Polbot